Isabelle Meyer is a Swiss football midfielder who plays for SKN St. Pölten in the Austrian ÖFB-Frauenliga. She previously played in the Nationalliga A for FC Luzern, with which she also played the European Cup, and Grasshopper-Club and SC Freiburg in the 1st Bundesliga. She has been a member of the Swiss national team since making her debut in April 2007 against the Czech Republic.

References

1987 births
Living people
Swiss women's footballers
Swiss expatriate sportspeople in Germany
Expatriate women's footballers in Germany
Switzerland women's international footballers
SC Freiburg (women) players
SC Sand players
Grasshopper Club Zürich (women) players
Swiss Women's Super League players
Women's association football midfielders
FC Luzern Frauen players
Swiss expatriate women's footballers